Gething MAY be a surname or a well used Welsh forename and may refer

 Glyn Gething (1892–1977), Welsh rugby union player
 Michael Gething, Australian official
 Richard Gething (c.1585–c.1652), English calligrapher
 Vaughan Gething (born 1974), Zambia-born Welsh politician

See also
 Gethin